In sailing, a snow, snaw or snauw is a square-rigged vessel with two masts, complemented by a snow- or trysail-mast stepped immediately abaft (behind) the main mast.

History 
The word 'snow' comes from 'snauw', which is an old Dutch word for beak, a reference to the characteristic sharp bow of the vessel. The snow evolved from the (three-masted) ship: the mizzen mast of a ship was gradually moved closer towards the mainmast, until the mizzen mast was no longer a separate mast, but was instead made fast at the main mast top. As such, in the 17th century the snow used to be sometimes classified as a three-masted vessel.

The snow dates back to the late 17th century and originally had a loose-footed gaff sail; the boom was introduced somewhere in the 18th century. It was a popular type of vessel in the Baltic Sea and was employed by a large number of nations during its time. The snow was considered a handy and fast sailing vessel, typically the largest two-masted vessel around, and was employed in both navy and merchant service. When used as a naval vessel, snows were, in the early 18th century, typically fitted with 5 to 16 guns. Naval snows were mostly used for coastal patrols and privateering, while in the merchant service, snows traded all the way to the Mediterranean and sometimes even sailed as far as the West Indies.

Comparison with brig 

While the snow and the brig might appear closely related, this is in fact not the case. The two rigs developed from different directions, the brig evolving from the generally smaller brigantine, and the much older snow evolving from the larger three-masted ship.

The most visible difference between the brig and the snow is the latter's "snow-mast", stepped directly behind the main mast. In contrast to the brig, where the gaff and boom attach directly to the main mast, a snow's gaff, and in later times, its boom, were attached to the snow-mast. The use of this characteristic snow-mast offered several advantages over attaching the gaff directly to the main mast.

The yoke (or jaw) of the gaff and the lacing of the gaff sail on a snow could move freely on the snow mast, unhindered by the iron bands that held together the (main) mast, nor limited by the main yard. The gaff on the snow mast could be raised higher than the main yard and independently of it. The resulting freedom allowed a snow, in contrast to a brig, to fly a main course without complications, as they typically did.

However, in the late 18th century, brigs started to set main courses as well, which gave rise to the term snow-brig. The differences lessened even further when the snow-mast was replaced by a steel cable, at which point the term "snow-brig" gradually became interchangeable with the term "brig" and the term "snow" fell in disuse.

See also 
 Brig
 Brigantine
 Full-rigged ship

Notes

References 
 Hans Haalmeijer: Pinassen, fluiten en galjassen Uitgeverij De Alk B.V., Alkmaar, the Netherlands 2009.
 Karl Heinz Marquardt: Bemastung und Takelung von Schiffen des 18. Jahrhunderts. Weltbild Verlag, Augsburg 1994.
 John Robinson, George Francis Dow: The Sailing Ships of New England 1607 – 1907.  Marine Research Society, Salem, Mass 1922.
 Dik Vuik, Hans Haalmeijer: Aken, tjalken en kraken, Uitgeverij De Alk B.V.,  Alkmaar, the Netherlands 2006.

External links 
 
 

Sailing rigs and rigging
Merchant sailing ship types
Naval sailing ship types
Tall ships